The 1993 Southwest Texas State Bobcats football team was an American football team that represented Southwest Texas State University (now known as Texas State University) during the 1993 NCAA Division I-AA football season as a member of the Southland Conference (SLC). In their second year under head coach Jim Bob Helduser, the team compiled an overall record of 2–9 with a mark of 1–6 in conference play.

Schedule

References

Southwest Texas State
Texas State Bobcats football seasons
Southwest Texas State Bobcats football